Thunichal is a 2010 Indian Tamil-language action film written and directed by Majith who earlier directed Vijay starrer Thamizhan. Starring Arun Vijay and newcomer Shiva Manjal, the film was released on 1 January 2010, after many delays.

Cast
Arun Vijay as Shiva
Ramana as Vinod
Shiva Manjal as Sakthi
Swathika
Vaiyapuri
Gangai Amaren
Singamuthu
Halwa Vasu
Citizen Mani

Production
The shooting for Thunichal began shooting in September 2007 and was completed by the end of the year, except for the dubbing portions. Subsequently, the film was postponed indefinitely due to unknown reasons, and remained unreleased. The actors and director involved moved on to participate with other projects. However, after the success of lead actor, Arun Vijay's Malai Malai, the producers decided to use his new-found publicity to launch their own film. Arun Vijay, worried that the move could hamper his new-found image at the box office, lodged a complaint with the Nadigar Sangam, alleging that the producers of Thunichal were attempting to release the film without his voice. Soon after, he retracted his statements and refuted that the film would not damage his reputation.

Release

Reception
The film opened in only a few centres across Chennai, Tamil Nadu, to a below-average response. The film grossed 3,15,630 during its opening weekend and failed commercially at the box office.

Reviews
Upon release, the film received highly negative reviews. A reviewer from Behindwoods.com claimed in regard to the cast that "Arun Vijay seems to be in a lost plot after his Malai Malai high but that Ramana impressed with "his cold villainy" and the "other performances don’t count for much". The director was criticized, citing that "he fails to hold the viewers’ attention right from the start" and a "few interesting scenes which would have enhanced the quality of the film". Regarding the work from the technical crew, the reviewer cited that "there is nothing much that stands out", while the music by Premji Amaran "fails to make any sort of impact".

Soundtrack
The soundtrack was the first soundtrack composed by music director Premji Amaran, who during the postponement of the film, went on to become a popular actor.

References

External links
 

2010 films
2010 action films
2010s Tamil-language films
Films scored by Premgi Amaren
Indian action films